"Hear The Crowd" is a song by recording artist A-Lee from his second studio album, Forever Lost (2012). It was released on May 30, 2011 in Norway, on EE Records and Columbia/Sony Music Norway. A-Lee worked with producers Ground Rules.

"Hear The Crowd" is A-Lee's third single and it sold Gold in Norway and 7th most played song on all Norwegian radio in 2011.

Track listing

Personnel
 Björn Engelmann – mastering
 Shahrouz Ghafourian – executive producer, management
 Bjarte Giske – producer, engineer, mixer
 Marori Morningstar – photography
 Morten Pape – producer, engineer, mixer
 Ali Pirzad-Amoli – vocals, executive producer, artwork design

Chart positions and certifications

Release history

References

External links
 A-Lee Official Site

2011 singles
2011 songs